Redfish Lake is an alpine lake in Custer County, Idaho, just south of Stanley. It is the largest lake within the Sawtooth National Recreation Area.

The U.S. Forest Service has developed some facilities for hiking, camping, and water sports on Redfish Lake while largely maintaining the natural landscape of the Sawtooth Mountains. On the north shore sits a seasonal hotel and marina, Redfish Lake Lodge, which offers a cross-lake ferry service for hikers and sightseers in the summer.

Toponym

The lake is named for the brilliant sockeye salmon that once returned from the Pacific Ocean in such massive quantities that the lake shimmered red during spawning season. Currently, only a small percentage of the wild sockeye succeed in making  through the several hydroelectric dams along their route back to the lake to spawn.  Sockeye must not be targeted while fishing and must immediately be released if they are caught.

Geography

The peaks which frame the lake at its south end are

Access and amenities

A paved access road from State Highway 75 delivers visitors to a recreation area at the north shore of the lake. Facilities include campgrounds, cabins, picnic sites, toilets, drinking water, swimming beaches, a boat launch, and a horse corral. Trailheads grant access to a number of trails for hiking, backpacking, horseback riding, and mountain biking, both around the lake and into the mountains (permits may be required). A visitors center runs interpretive programs.

References

Lakes of Idaho
Lakes of Custer County, Idaho
Glacial lakes of the United States